Gaona may refer to:

 People
 Álvaro Gaona (born 1985), Mexican boxer
 Antonio Gaona (general) (1793–1848), Mexican general
 Antonio Gaona (actor) (born 1982), Mexican actor
 Citlalli Gaona-Tiburcio, Mexican materials scientist
 Jorge Gaona (born 1985), Paraguayan footballer
 José Julio Gaona (born 1943), Mexican painter
 Juan de Gaona (1507–1560), Spanish Franciscan and Mesoamericanist
 Julio César Gaona (born 1973), Argentinian footballer
 Octavio Gaona (1907–1996), Mexican professional wrestler
 Orlando Gaona Lugo (born 1990), Paraguayan footballer

 Places
 Gaona, Argentina, village and rural municipality in Salta Province